Egon Fleischmann (born 26 August 1934) is a German cross-country skier. He competed in the men's 50 kilometre event at the 1960 Winter Olympics.

References

External links
 

1934 births
Living people
German male cross-country skiers
Olympic cross-country skiers of the United Team of Germany
Cross-country skiers at the 1960 Winter Olympics
People from Schmalkalden-Meiningen
Sportspeople from Thuringia